"Embraceable You" is a jazz standard song with music by George Gershwin and lyrics by Ira Gershwin. The song was written in 1928 for an unpublished operetta named East Is West. It was published in 1930 and included in that year's Broadway musical Girl Crazy, performed by Ginger Rogers in a song and dance routine choreographed by Fred Astaire.

Billie Holiday's 1944 recording was inducted into the Grammy Hall of Fame in 2005.

Other versions
 Irene Cara in City Heat 
 Nat King Cole – (1943)
 Bing Crosby (recorded November 12, 1947) – included in the album Bing Crosby Sings Songs by George Gershwin.
 Ella Fitzgerald – Ella Fitzgerald Sings the George and Ira Gershwin Songbook (1959)
 Jane Froman – With a Song in My Heart
 Judy Garland – Girl Crazy, film (1943)
 Erroll Garner
 Herbie Hancock – Gershwin's World (1998)
 Billie Holiday – 1944
 Billie Holiday – Body and Soul (1957)
 Chet Baker – Embraceable You (album) (1957) 
 Charlie Parker – Cool Bird (1947)
 Hazel Scott – 1942
 Idina Menzel – 2010
 Ornette Coleman – This Is Our Music (1961)
 Harve Presnell – When the Boys Meet the Girls (1965)
 Martin Taylor –  Love Songs 2019
 Brent Spiner – Ol' Yellow Eyes Is Back (1991)
 Geri Allen – Timeless Portraits and Dreams (2006)
 Johnny Mathis – Open Fire, Two Guitars'' (1959)

See also
 List of 1930s jazz standards

References

1928 songs
1930s jazz standards
Songs with music by George Gershwin
Songs with lyrics by Ira Gershwin
Ella Fitzgerald songs
Nat King Cole songs
Grammy Hall of Fame Award recipients
Songs from Girl Crazy
Pop standards